"Love Is Stronger Than Death" is a song from The The's album Dusk. It was written by Matt Johnson, the only constant member of The The. Johnson wrote this song following the death of his brother. In his depression, he found that writing this song was therapeutic for him.

The title is a paraphrase of a biblical quote: "Set me as a seal upon thine heart, as a seal upon thine arm: for love is strong as death; jealousy is cruel as the grave: the coals thereof are coals of fire, which hath a most vehement flame." (Song of Solomon 8:6).

The song is also featured on the soundtrack to the Gregg Araki movie Nowhere, and plays over the film's closing credits.

The song went to #39 on the UK charts in 1993, and hit #14 on the Modern Rock charts.

Track listing
UK CD (Part 1) - Epic 659371 2
"Love Is Stronger Than Death"
"The Sinking Feeling" (Live)
"The Mercy Beat" (Live)
"Armageddon Days Are Here (Again)" (Live)

UK CD (Part 2) - Epic 659371 5
"Love Is Stronger Than Death"
"Infected" (New Version) (Live)
"Soul Mining" (New Version) (Live)
"Armageddon Days Are Here (Again)" (New Version) (Live)

References
This Is The Day - Discography
Discogs - The The - Love is Stronger Than Death

1993 singles
The The songs
1993 songs
Epic Records singles
Songs about death